Vagif Sadygov (born 1 April 1959, Azerbaijani: Vaqif Sadıqov) is an Azerbaijani football manager.

Life and career
Sadygov started playing football as a midfielder for Araz Nakhichevan. His club career included spells with Neftchi Baku, Khazar Sumgayit and FC Nistru Otaci. After end of his career, he moved into management, first with Neftchi Baku in 1993, then with ANS Pivani Baki. He also managed Shafa Baku, Azerbaijan national under-21 football team in 1996, which then led him to manage  Azerbaijan national football team in 1997. After unsuccessful results, he dismissed in 1998, but returned in 2005 to replace the Brazilian Carlos Alberto Torres. He also managed Shafa Baku, Genclerbirliyi Sumgayit, Azerbaijan national under-21 football team.

Achievements
Azerbaijan Cup
Winner: 2 (1995, 2001)
Azerbaijan Supercup
Winner: 1 (1995)
Azerbaijan First Division
Winner: 1 (1996)

Notes and references 

1959 births
Living people
Soviet footballers
Azerbaijani footballers
Azerbaijani football managers
Azerbaijan national football team managers
Azerbaijani expatriate football managers
Footballers from Baku
Neftçi PFK players
Soviet Top League players
Association football midfielders
Soviet Azerbaijani people
Expatriate football managers in Russia
Expatriate football managers in Iran
Azerbaijani expatriate sportspeople in Iran
Azerbaijani expatriate sportspeople in Russia